The Secret of Mirror Bay is the forty-ninth volume in the Nancy Drew Mystery Stories series, published in 1972 under the pseudonym Carolyn Keene.

Plot summary 

Aunt Eloise invites Nancy and her friends to a cabin at Mirror Bay, in Cooperstown, New York, to solve a case of a mysterious woman seen gliding across the water. Nancy is then involved in a vacation hoax because she resembles a woman involved in the hoax. A strange green sorcerer who appears in the woods and a lost treasure involving the gliding woman lead Nancy and her friends to uncover a concealed operation in the woods.

References

Nancy Drew books
1972 American novels
1972 children's books
Novels set in New York (state)
Grosset & Dunlap books
Children's mystery novels